Platysternus is a monotypic beetle genus in the family Cerambycidae described by Pierre François Marie Auguste Dejean in 1835. Its only species, Platysternus hebraeus, was described by Johan Christian Fabricius in 1781.

References

Anisocerini
Monotypic beetle genera
Beetles described in 1781